The 1926 Louisville Colonels season was their fourth and final season in the league and only season as the Colonels. The team failed to improve on their previous output of 0-3, losing four games and failing to score a single point.

Season schedule

Roster

Standings

References

Louisville Brecks and Colonels (NFL) seasons

Louisville Colonels
Louisville Colonels
National Football League winless seasons